The New York and Putnam Railroad, nicknamed the Old Put, was a railroad line that operated between the Bronx and Brewster in New York State. It was in close proximity to the Hudson River Railroad and New York and Harlem Railroad. All three came under ownership of the New York Central system in 1894. The railroad was abandoned starting in 1958, and most of the former roadbed has been converted to rail trail use.

History

Early years, charter

The New York & Boston Railroad (NY&B) was chartered on May 21, 1869 to build a line from Highbridge on the Harlem River in New York northeast to Brewster. At Brewster connections were to be provided to the New York & Harlem Railroad for travel north to Albany, and to the Boston, Hartford & Erie Railroad to Boston.

The New York, Boston & Northern Railway (NYB&N) was formed on November 18, 1872, as a consolidation of the NY&B with two companies to the north — the Putnam & Dutchess Railroad (P&D) and Dutchess & Columbia Railroad (D&C). The P&D was a plan for a line to split from the New York and Boston at Carmel to a point midway along the D&C. The D&C opened in 1871, running from the Hudson River to the Connecticut border. The Clove Branch Railroad was to serve as a short connection between the two parts of the planned line.

The New York, Boston & Montreal Railway was organized on January 21, 1873, as a renaming of the NYB&N. It continued north to Chatham on what is now the defunct section of the Harlem Line and then used the Harlem Extension Railroad into Vermont. The Panic of 1873 caused the cancellation of the leases and mergers on December 1 of that year. Construction on the P&D and D&C stopped; D&C later became part of the Central New England Railway, the Harlem Extension became a part of the Rutland Railroad, and the Clove Branch Railroad was abandoned in 1898.

The New York, Westchester & Putnam Railway was formed on July 3, 1877, as a reorganization, and was leased to the New York City & Northern Railroad (NYC&N), formed on March 1, 1878. Between East View and Pocantico Hills, the NYC&N built a segment leading to a perilous 80-foot-high trestle over a marsh-filled valley. Because of the dangers of crossing the bridge, which often required that trains slow down to a crawl, the line was rerouted west around that valley in 1881. The bridge was torn down in 1883, and the valley became the Tarrytown Reservoir. The line finally opened under the original plan, ending at Brewster, in April 1881. That year, the New York & New England Railroad opened to the north, using some of the grade built for the P&D and D&C. The West Side & Yonkers Railway was leased to the NYC&N on May 1, 1880, extending the line south across the Harlem River to the northern terminal of the Ninth Avenue Elevated at 155th Street. It was merged into the NYC&N by 1887. In the 1910s, the Interborough Rapid Transit Company (IRT) of the New York City Subway purchased the bridge across the Harlem River to move its elevated lines north into the Bronx, cutting the NYP back to Sedgwick Avenue. The Yonkers Rapid Transit Railway was opened in 1888 as a branch from the NYP at Van Cortlandt northwest to Yonkers. It was merged into NYP by 1887.

Reorganization and decline

The company went into receivership by 1887 and was reorganized as the New York & Northern Railway. By 1894 it was reorganized as the New York & Putnam Railroad (NY&P) by J. P. Morgan, who in turn leased the railroad to the New York Central & Hudson River Railroad (NYC&HR). The line eventually became the Putnam Division of the New York Central Railroad (NYC) by 1913. The line lacked a direct connection to NYC's flagship station, Grand Central Terminal (GCT), which hurt ridership throughout its existence. Passengers were forced to transfer at Highbridge to reach GCT. The Sedgwick Avenue-Van Cortlandt section and the Yonkers Branch were electrified in 1926.

Several short branches were eliminated after the 1920s. The Mohansic Branch near Yorktown Heights, originally built to serve a mental institution that was canceled by Albany, went first. In 1929, John D. Rockefeller, Jr. had the tracks removed from his Pocantico Hills property, eliminating four stations while creating one. The nearby village of East View was obliterated to build the new line. The Getty Square Branch was abandoned on June 30, 1943. Despite a legal battle by Yonkers residents which reached the United States Supreme Court to save it, the line was scrapped in December 1944.

The first diesel locomotive passenger train in the U.S. ran on the Putnam on March 18, 1929.

Besides the regular Sedgwick Avenue–Brewster service, service also operated from Golden's Bridge on the Harlem Division via a connecting branch to Lake Mahopac, and then over the Putnam Division to Brewster, where it returned to the Harlem Division. Trains taking this route were said to go "around the horn".

End of service 
NYC saw the Putnam Division as a dispensable stepchild. The line lacked a second track, electrification, commuter parking and direct service to GCT, all of which the parallel Harlem and Hudson Divisions had, resulting in declining patronage. In 1956, the New York Central asked for permission to discontinue service on the line. On May 14, 1957, the Public Service Commission allowed a 15 percent increase in fares, but required that service be run on the Putnam Division on a limited basis. On March 12, 1958, the Public Service Commission authorized the NYC to end passenger service on the Putnam on June 1, 1958. At the time, the line had less than 500 daily riders, and discontinuing the line was expected to save $400,000 annually. The last trains ran on May 29, 1958, as there was no weekend service on the line. Service "around the horn" via the Harlem Division's Lake Mahopac Branch continued until April 2, 1959. Until 1962, when NYC's West Shore Railroad was upgraded, the Putnam served oversize freight trains, due to the lack of tunnels on the line. Tracks between East View and Lake Mahopac were removed in 1962.

NYC merged with long-time rival Pennsylvania Railroad to form Penn Central (PC) in 1968. Freight service on the northern part of the Putnam ended in March 1970. The southern end of the line remained in service until the closing of the A&P warehouse in Elmsford, in 1975. The decrease in traffic from Stauffer Chemical cut back the line to Chauncey by 1977. Conrail took over the bankrupt PC in April 1976, but had no plans for increasing business. The last customer was the Stella D'Oro bakery in the Bronx, which stopped using the railroad in 1989, after which Conrail wanted to sell the right-of-way to the city and Westchester to reduce its tax bill.

In 1991, the Regional Plan Association proposed extending the line and connecting it with the IRT Broadway–Seventh Avenue Line of the New York City Subway.

Legacy

The Metro-North Railroad uses the remaining stub near Marble Hill station to store maintenance-of-way and contractors' trains, and for material delivery in the vicinity of West 225th Street. The roadbed north of the former Van Cortlandt station has been converted into the Putnam Greenway, South County Trailway, North County Trailway, and Putnam County Trailway rail trails.

A replica of the former Bryn Mawr Park station at the former Palmer Road grade crossing is in use as a grocery. The station in Briarcliff Manor was purchased by the village in 1959 and converted into the Briarcliff Manor Public Library.  The station in Elmsford serves as a restaurant. The Yorktown Heights station had its exterior restored and is the centerpiece of the town park. The station in Lake Mahopac has been an American Legion Hall since 1965. The freight house in Baldwin Place and the station in Tilly Foster are on private property.

The Getty Square Branch still shows evidence of its existence, with vestiges of the railroad and stations, and neighborhoods exhibiting characteristics of transit-oriented development. Getty Square station, originally a head house and train shed, was replaced by an office building, which still stands and is ornamented on its exterior and in its lobby with images of locomotives. The -long right-of-way is part of the trail system in Van Cortlandt Park, including the bridge that carried the branch over the Henry Hudson Parkway. Old railroad ties can be found along the right-of-way. The right-of-way within New York City ends at a parking garage for an apartment building in Yonkers. To the north of the apartment building, another parking lot was built. The bridge over the adjacent street was walled-in where the ROW used to pass underneath.

Abutments of the former branch can be found at School Street across from Herriott Street, McLean Avenue near South Broadway, and the former Lowerre Station on Lawrence Street at Western Avenue. The former Caryl Station on Caryl Avenue between Saratoga and Van Cortlandt Park Avenues, with the tunnel into Van Cortlandt Park walled-off by cinder blocks, is now the Caryl parking lot and playground. A lot of the intrusions on the branch were from the expansion of outside storage from adjacent industries, which broke up the right-of-way in many places, especially in Yonkers.

Private homes that once served the branch include the termini houses of the Park Hill station's adjacent funicular, on Undercliff at Park Hill Terrace, and on Alta Avenue north of Overcliff, and the home of the railroad's president, also on Alta Avenue. North from the Yonkers-New York City boundary, the path of the route generally follows the path of the Saw Mill River Parkway until it reaches East Irvington.

Image gallery

Station listing

Main Line
NOTE: Stations along pre-1918 Manhattan terminus and pre-1931 Tarrytown Heights alignment are shaded in darker gray.

Branches

Getty Square Branch

Mohansic Branch

Mahopac Mines Branch

Lake Mahopac Branch

See also
 New York Central Railroad

References

Further reading

External links

 Timeline of Putnam Division events
 Stations along the trail on the Putnam Division Right-Of-Way
 Old Putnam Line Blogs (Rich's Pedal Point)
 Putnam County Existing Stations: has pictures of old Put stations.
 Westchester County Existing Stations: has pictures of old Put stations.

Predecessors of the New York Central Railroad
Defunct New York (state) railroads
Railway companies established in 1894
Railway companies disestablished in 1913
1869 establishments in New York (state)
1894 establishments in New York (state)
American companies established in 1894
Subdivisions of the New York Central Railroad